The Anti-Barricade Law is a Chilean law created in the context of the 2019–20 Chilean protests which increases the punishments for setting up barricades, carrying out plunder or throwing objects at people or vehicles. It modifies four articles of the Penal Code of Chile:
449 and 450: Penalities for various theft crimes have now no amelioration for first-time offenders. Custodial sentences for crimes committed during a calamity or a state of alteration of public order are increased by one degree.   
268: Successfully blocking free passage by intimidation, threat of violence or with objects is now punished with no less than imprisonment at its least degree. 
269: Disturbance of public tranquility motivated by aims judged reprehensible leads now to ordinary imprisonment in its least degree. 
 
On March 3, 2020, a group of Primera Línea was rounded up and detained by Carabineros enforcing the newly drafted law. Subsequently, only one of the 44 detained was kept in preventive prison; the remaining were set free but required to report and sign-in twice a month. During the truck driver's strike of August 2020 in which a series of major roads and highways in Chile were blocked the Anti-Barricade Law was not applied. The President of the Federation of Chilean Industry (SOFOFA) Bernardo Larraín Matte criticized the government for this.

References

2020 protests
2020 riots
Protests in Chile
Riots and civil disorder in Chile
Protest tactics
Law of Chile
2020 in Chilean law
2019–2020 Chilean protests
Anti-protest law